Nixon Kiprotich (born December 4, 1962, in Baringo) is a former Kenyan 800 metres runner, who won the silver medal at the 1992 Olympic Games. Previously, Kiprotich had come eighth in the 1988 Olympic final.

He finished 3rd at the 1989 IAAF World Cup 800 metres race. In 1989 he had won the African Championships and in 1990 he came second in the Commonwealth Games. During the summer of 1992 Kiprotich won several Grand Prix meetings where he defeated William Tanui to whom he lost in the Olympic final. Kiprotich was ranked No.1 in the world over 800m in 1993.

References

External links

 Profile

1962 births
Living people
Kenyan male middle-distance runners
Athletes (track and field) at the 1988 Summer Olympics
Athletes (track and field) at the 1990 Commonwealth Games
Athletes (track and field) at the 1992 Summer Olympics
Medalists at the 1992 Summer Olympics
Olympic athletes of Kenya
Olympic silver medalists for Kenya
Commonwealth Games medallists in athletics
People from Baringo County
Olympic silver medalists in athletics (track and field)
Commonwealth Games silver medallists for Kenya
20th-century Kenyan people
Medallists at the 1990 Commonwealth Games